"Betty (Get Money)", also referred to as just "Betty", is a song by American rapper Yung Gravy, released through Republic Records on June 10, 2022, as the lead single from his third studio album, Marvelous. It was written by Yung Gravy and produced by Nick Seeley, Dillon Francis and Dwilly, along with the credit for its prominent interpolation of Rick Astley's "Never Gonna Give You Up". The song and its music video, featuring Yung Gravy dancing in a white fur coat, went viral on TikTok shortly after its release, being used in over 300,000 videos.

Background
"Betty (Get Money)" is the second song by Yung Gravy to receive viral attention on TikTok, with his 2020 track "Oops!" also seeing some success on the application. Of the over 100,000 videos made since its June 2022 release, many include the bridge "Damn Gravy you so vicious, you so clean, so delicious / How come you ain't got no missus?" The song samples both the synthesizer and chorus from English singer Rick Astley's Stock Aitken Waterman-written and produced 1987 song "Never Gonna Give You Up", and thus credits the trio as songwriters.

Lawsuit
Although Astley agreed to license the music and lyrics to "Never Gonna Give You Up", he never authorized Gravy to directly copy his voice. On January 26, 2023, Astley filed a lawsuit in a Los Angeles court, objecting to Gravy's use of an impersonator to mimic Astley's voice.

Music video
The music video, released alongside the song on June 10, 2022, also saw viral attention. It includes "fake backdrops, turtlenecks, and a groovy two-step".

Commercial performance
"Betty (Get Money)" is Yung Gravy's first entry on the US Billboard Hot 100, debuting at number 68 in July 2022.

Charts

Weekly charts

Year-end charts

Certifications

References

2022 singles
2022 songs
Republic Records singles
Song recordings produced by Dillon Francis
Songs written by Mike Stock (musician)
Songs written by Pete Waterman
Songs written by Matt Aitken
Songs written by Rick Astley